The R398 road is a regional road in Ireland, located in County Longford.

References

Regional roads in the Republic of Ireland
Roads in County Longford